In Protestant Christianity, a day of humiliation or fasting was a publicly proclaimed day of fasting and prayer in response to an event thought to signal God's judgement. A day of thanksgiving was a day set aside for public worship in thanksgiving for events believed to signal God's mercy and favor. Such a day might be proclaimed by the civil authority or the church.

History
National days of prayer for specific occasions had been ordered in England as early as 1009 by King Æthelred the Unready. Occasional days of fasting were held in England in the middle of the sixteenth century under Elizabeth I in response to plague outbreaks and the Armada Crisis of 1588. Puritans especially embraced occasional days of fasting. By the middle of the seventeenth century, days of thanksgiving were celebrated in New England annually in November.

Days of humiliation and fasting
A day of humiliation and fasting might be proclaimed in response to a drought, flood, fire, military defeat, or plague. They might also be held before the undertaking of a difficult endeavor. People were expected to search themselves for sin and to repent in order to appease God's wrath. Everyone between the ages of sixteen and sixty was expected to spend the entire day in fasting, church attendance, listening to sermons of exhortation and meditating on their sin.

Days of thanksgiving
A day of thanksgiving might be held in response to signs of God's mercy, such as rain allowing a good harvest, arrival of needed supplies, or recovery from sickness. They might also be held after a long period of general success and lack of disaster. On days of thanksgiving, the faithful would also spend the day in church attendance, but would pray thankfully, sing psalms of praise, and feast. Puritan feast days were more solemn and demanding than traditional Christian feasts. Days of thanksgiving were celebrated with joy in thanks for recent blessing, but Puritans also saw them as days to look forward to the coming of the Kingdom of God.

As replacements of traditional holidays
Puritans rejected the traditional Christian liturgical calendar of holy days, including Easter and Christmas, as well as saints' days, but set aside special days in response to current events. However, natural cycles caused penance and rebirth to continue to be associated with Spring, as had been the case with Easter. Thanksgiving days were normally celebrated in Autumn following the harvest.

References

Bibliography

Further reading

Puritanism
Thanksgiving